Arabs in Pakistan primarily, consists of migrants from the Arab world.

Numbers

Egyptians
There were some 1,500 Egyptians living in Pakistan during the 1990s. Following the 1995 attack on the Egyptian embassy in Pakistan by Egyptian Islamic Jihad militants, the Egyptian government renewed its security focus and collaborated with the Pakistani government to remove any Egyptian nationals from the country who were found to be involved in militant activities; consequently, many Egyptians living in Pakistan were expelled or faced a crackdown by the Pakistani government. An extradition treaty was signed between the two countries, ensuring that any wanted Egyptians apprehended in Pakistan could be more efficiently mainlined back to Cairo.

Emiratis
Emirati nationals and royalty periodically visit Pakistan for the purpose of hunting local animals, such as falcons (namely MacQueen's bustards). In the city of Rahim Yar Khan in Pakistani Punjab, the founding father of the United Arab Emirates, Sheikh Zayed, built his own summer palace and an airport for his personal use whenever he visited Pakistan for hunting and recreation. The tradition has been revived by many other royal figures, amid rage by ecologists over the declining population of falcons and other wildlife.

Jordanians
The Jordanian diaspora in Pakistan mainly consists of international students.

Syrians
There are approximately 200 Syrian Arabs in Pakistan, many of whom are also students enrolled in Pakistani institutions. In May 2011, Syrian expatriates were seen protesting outside the Syrian embassy in Islamabad and condemning Bashar Al-Assad, the president of Syria since 2000, amid nationwide protests in Syria.

Syeds, Tamim, Arains and Awans 
There are numerous Syed people (also spelt Sayyid; denoting those accepted as descendants of the Islamic prophet Muhammad) in Pakistan. The ancestors of Syeds in Pakistan reportedly first migrated to Bukhara in modern-day Uzbekistan and then to South Asia. Others are said to have settled in Sindh in an attempt to escape persecution by various caliphs of the Umayyad and Abbasid caliphates. Syeds in Pakistan are widely regarded to be among the most prominent and well-established people of the country, with a number of them having become popular and well-known religious icons and/or political leaders.

See also 
 Arab–Pakistan relations
 Arab diaspora

References

History of Pakistan
Ethnic groups in Pakistan
Social groups of Pakistan
Immigration to Pakistan